Benjamin Wolozin is an American pharmacologist and neurologist currently at Boston University School of Medicine and an Elected Fellow of the American Association for the Advancement of Science.  Benjamin Wolozin, M.D., Ph.D. received his B.A. from Wesleyan University (Middletown, CT) and his M.D., Ph.D. from the Albert Einstein College of Medicine. He is currently a professor of Pharmacology, Neurology and the Program in Neuroscience at Boston University School of Medicine. He is also co-founder and Chief Scientific Officer (CSO) of Aquinnah Pharmaceuticals Inc., a biotechnology company developing novel therapeutics to treat Alzheimer's disease and Amyotrophic Lateral Sclerosis.

Dr. Wolozin has published over 150 papers, including publications in Science, Nature and PNAS. He has received numerous awards through his career including election as a fellow of the AAAS, the Spivack Distinguished Scholar in Neuroscience Award (BU), the Zenith Award (Alzheimer Association), Collaborator of the Year (BU Evans Center), Fellow of the Society for Skeptical Inquiry, Teacher of the year (Loyola University), A.E. Bennett Award (Soc. For Biological Psychiatry), Commissioned Officer Commendation Award (PHS), Donald B. Linsdley Award (Soc. For Neuroscience), Medical Scientist Training Fellowship, NSF Fellowship (declined), Hawk Prize for Biochemical Research (Wesleyan), Departmental Honors and Magna Cum Laude Latin honors (Wesleyan University).

Dr. Wolozin has extensive research experience in the field of neurodegenerative disease.  His research investigates the pathophysiology of several neurodegenerative diseases, including Alzheimer's disease, Parkinson's disease and amyotrophic lateral sclerosis. His research examines molecular and cellular aspects of disease, and utilizes a variety of transgenic models including mice, C. elegans, primary neurons and cell lines. Dr. Wolozin is also experienced in the study of human brain samples or cell lines from patients. His specific research interests emphasize the role of protein aggregation in neurodegenerative disease as well as metabolic consequences of stress linked to protein aggregation or cellular damage.

Dr. Wolozin's contributions to understanding of neurodegenerative disease cover a wide range of subjects. In 1986 he identified the antibody Alz-50, which was one of the first antibodies to identify the conformation specific epitopes of microtubule associated protein tau that are abundant in the brains of patients with Alzheimer's disease. In 2000 he was the first scientist to show that individuals taking statins (a form of cholesterol lowering medication) exhibit much lower rates of Alzheimer's disease.

Stress granules and neurodegenerative diseases

Since 2008, Dr. Wolozin's research has focused on the role of RNA binding proteins and stress granules in neurodegenerative diseases.   RNA binding proteins contain domains that have only a few types of amino acids; these domains are termed "low complexity domains" and have a strong tendency to aggregate.  A highly unusual and important aspect of these proteins is that they use reversible aggregation as normal biological mechanism to sequester RNA transcripts. RNA binding proteins form a variety of cellular aggregates including stress granules, transport granules, P-bodies and nuclear speckles. In 2010 Dr. Wolozin's group was one of the first groups to suggest that dysfunction of the stress granule pathway contributes to the pathophysiology of amyotrophic lateral sclerosis. Since then, a growing body of evidence, increasingly highlights the important contributions of RNA-binding proteins (RBPs), stress granules and translational regulation in the pathophysiology of neurodegenerative disease.  This work prompted the concept that "regulated protein aggregation", which provides a theoretical framework for understanding the biology of neurodegenerative disease, including Alzheimer's disease and Amyotrophic Lateral Sclerosis. The cell controls the location and disposition of RNA through the binding of RNA-binding proteins; these RNA binding proteins consolidate to form RNA granules through reversible aggregation of their low complexity domains. Recently, the biophysics of RNA granule formation has been shown to fall under the aegis of a general property, termed liquid liquid phase separation (LLPS). LLPS occurs when RNA binding proteins associate to form structures analogous to liquid droplets, which separate from surrounding aqueous medium.

The Wolozin laboratory has extended this work to explain the pathophysiology of Alzheimer's disease  Work from the Wolozin laboratory demonstrates that the pathology occurring in neurons (neurofibrillary tangles) is associated with RNA binding proteins. This appears to occur because tau (the main building block of neurofibrillary tangles) stimulates stress granule formation. Importantly, the converse is also true. Stress granules appear able to stimulate tau pathology, leading to the hypothesis that Alzheimer's disease occurs in part because of a hyperactive stress granule response stimulated by chronic diseases and/or genetic changes, which results in abundant tau pathology and subsequent neurodegeneration.

The stress granule/LLPS hypothesis is important because it identifies new directions for therapeutic intervention for tauopathies and other neurodegenerative diseases. Dr. Wolozin has developed methods to analyze the pathological RNA granules and stress granules that accumulate in brain diseases. He has also developed a series of compounds that potently and effectively inhibit TDP-43 aggregation in multiple neuronal models. In 2014, Dr. Wolozin combined forces with Glenn Larsen, Ph.D. to co-found the biotechnology company, Aquinnah Pharmaceuticals. Aquinnah Pharmaceuticals Inc. is dedicated to developing novel medicines to treat neurodegenerative diseases, and using a technology platform that focuses on the roles of RNA binding proteins, RNA metabolism and stress granules in neurodegenerative diseases.

Oath of the Scientist

Benjamin co-authored the scientists' pledge with Katya Ravid . The pledge provides the equivalent for scientists of the Hippocratic Oath and is recited at graduation at some schools.

References

Year of birth missing (living people)
Living people
Fellows of the American Association for the Advancement of Science
Wesleyan University alumni
American pharmacologists
American neurologists